Surrey-Whalley is a provincial electoral district for the Legislative Assembly of British Columbia, Canada.  The riding's name was resurrected from a former riding in the same area, with similar but not identical boundaries. The newly created riding of Surrey-Whalley kept the majority of the original Surrey-Whalley riding and added a portion of Surrey-Green Timbers.

Member of Legislative Assembly 
On account of the realignment of electoral boundaries, most incumbents did not represent the entirety of their listed district during the preceding legislative term. Its MLA is Bruce Ralston. He was first elected in 2005, and was re-elected in the 2009 election. He represents the British Columbia New Democratic Party.

Election results 

|-

|-

|NDP
|Joan Smallwood
|align="right"|4,536
|align="right"|30.99%
|align="right"|
|align="right"|$42,735

|}

|}

|-

|NDP
|Joan K. Smallwood
|align="right"|7,243
|align="right"|47.77%
|align="right"|
|align="right"|$37,199

|}

References

External links 
BC Stats - 2001
Results of 2001 election (pdf)
2001 Expenditures (pdf)
Results of 1996 election
1996 Expenditures
Results of 1991 election
1991 Expenditures
Website of the Legislative Assembly of British Columbia

British Columbia provincial electoral districts
Politics of Surrey, British Columbia
Provincial electoral districts in Greater Vancouver and the Fraser Valley